Bar Gali (also Romanized as Bār Galī; also known as Bār Kalī) is a village in Otaqvar Rural District, Otaqvar District, Langarud County, Gilan Province, Iran. At the 2006 census, its population was 26, in 4 families.

References 

Populated places in Langarud County